The 2018 Basketball League of Serbia playoffs is the play-off tournament that decided the winner of the Basketball League of Serbia for  the 2017–18 season. The playoffs started on 21 May and ended on 11 June 2018.

Qualified teams

Bracket

Quarterfinals

|}

1st leg

2nd leg

3rd leg

5th–8th place semifinals

|}

1st leg

2nd leg

3rd leg

Seventh place games  

|}

1st leg

2nd leg

3rd leg

Semifinals

|}

1st leg

2nd leg

3rd leg

Finals

|}

1st leg

2nd leg

3rd leg

See also
List of current Basketball League of Serbia team rosters
2018 ABA League Playoffs
Teams 
 2017–18 KK Crvena zvezda season
 2017–18 KK Partizan season

References

External links
 Official website of Serbian Basketball League

P
Basketball
Basketball League of Serbia playoffs